Neil Hallett (born John W. Neil; 30 June 1924 – 5 December 2004) was a Belgian-born English actor. His stage name was taken from a combination of his proper surname, Neil, and his grandmother's maiden name, Hallet.

He appeared in many British television series including The Adventures of Robin Hood, No Hiding Place, The Avengers, Out of the Unknown, Department S, Z-Cars, UFO, The New Avengers, Doctor Who, Jeeves and Wooster and films such as X the Unknown (1956) and Virgin Witch (1972).

Acting credits

References

External links
 

1924 births
2004 deaths
Belgian male actors
English male stage actors
English male film actors
English male television actors
Belgian emigrants to the United Kingdom